The Sparrhorn (3,021 m) is a mountain of the Bernese Alps, located north of Belalp in the canton of Valais. It lies at the eastern end of the range located south of the Oberaletsch Glacier, west of the Aletsch Glacier.

From Belalp a trail leads to its summit.

References

External links
 Sparrhorn on Hikr

Bernese Alps
Mountains of the Alps
Alpine three-thousanders
Mountains of Switzerland
Mountains of Valais